Genuine Parts Company (GPC) is an American service organization engaged in the distribution of automotive replacement parts, industrial replacement parts, office products and electrical/electronic materials. GPC serves numerous customers from more than 2,600 operations around the world, and has approximately 48,000 employees. It owns the NAPA Auto Parts brand.

Company overview
Founded in 1925, GPC is headquartered in Atlanta, Georgia and consists of multiple subsidiaries that distribute automotive replacement parts, industrial replacement parts, office products and electrical/electronic materials. The company has paid a cash dividend to shareholders every year since going public in 1948. The company moved into its new headquarters building in the Wildwood area of Cobb County, Georgia in June 2016.

Automotive parts
The Automotive Parts Group, the largest division of GPC, distributes approximately 475,000 automotive replacement parts, accessory items and service items throughout North America, Australia and New Zealand. In North America, parts are sold primarily under the NAPA brand name. The company's GPC Asia Pacific business serves the Australasian markets primarily under the brand name Repco.

Industrial parts
The Industrial Parts Group, which operates under the name Motion Industries, offers access to industrial replacement parts and related supplies and serves over 150,000 MRO and OEM customers throughout North America and in all types of industries. These include the food and beverage, forest products, primary metal, pulp and paper, mining, automotive, oil and gas, petrochemical and pharmaceutical industries.

Office products
The Office Products Group, which operates under the name S. P. Richards Company, distributes more than 62,000 items to over 6,300 resellers and distributors throughout the United States and Canada from a network of 45 distribution centers. Customers include independently owned office product dealers, large contract stationers, national office supply superstores, mail order distributors, internet resellers, college bookstores, office furniture dealers, janitorial and sanitation supply distributors, safety product resellers and food service distributors.

S. P. Richards was sold on June 30, 2020, to H.I.G. Capital.

Electrical/electronic materials
The Electrical/Electronic Materials Group, which operates under the name EIS, Inc., distributes process materials, production supplies, industrial MRO and custom-engineered value added fabricated parts to more than 20,000 customers, including original equipment manufacturers, motor repair shops and a broad variety of industrial assembly and specialty wire and cable markets in North America. Products cover over 100,000 items including wire and cable, insulating and conductive materials, assembly tools and test equipment.

History  
In 1925, Carlyle and Malcolm Fraser founded GPC, with the purchase of Motor Parts Depot in Atlanta, Georgia for $40,000. They renamed the parts store Genuine Parts Company. The original Genuine Parts Company store had annual sales of just $75,000, and six employees.

For the next 50+ years, GPC, in relationship with NAPA, the National Automotive Parts Association, grew rapidly as independent garages for car repair emerged to meet the needs of the nation's growing number of motor vehicles. In the last 35+ years, GPC has continued to grow through the acquisition of other companies in the automotive industry, as well as in the industrial, office and electrical industries.

Today GPC is a parts distributor with over 3,100 operations and approximately 48,000 employees.

Company timeline 

1925    National Automotive Parts Association established.
1928    Genuine Parts Company established.
1948    GPC Initial Public Offering.
1975    Acquired S.P. Richards Company.
1976    Acquired Motion Industries.
1994    Joint Venture with Auto Todo.
1998    Acquired EIS.
2008    Acquired Altrom.
2013    Acquired GPC Asia Pacific.
2016    Acquired AMX Superstores
2016    Acquired Auto-Camping
2017    Acquired Inenco Group (Australia).

Subsidiaries 

The Automotive Parts Group  distributes automotive replacement parts, accessory items and service items throughout North America, Australia and New Zealand.  In North America, parts are sold primarily under the NAPA (National Automotive Parts Association) brand name. The company's GPC Asia Pacific business serves the Australasian markets primarily under the brand name Repco.

The Automotive Parts Group supports over 6,000 NAPA AUTO PARTS stores throughout the United States, 700 wholesalers in Canada and 481 automotive locations in Australia and New Zealand. These stores sell to both the Retail (DIY) and Commercial (DIFM) automotive aftermarket customer and cover the majority of all domestic and foreign motor vehicle models.

The Industrial Parts Group, operating under the name Motion Industries, offers more than 5.9 million industrial replacement parts and related supplies. The Group serves over 150,000 MRO and OEM customers throughout North America and in all types of industries. These include the food and beverage, forest products, primary metal, pulp and paper, mining, automotive, oil and gas, petrochemical and pharmaceutical industries. Strategically targeted specialty industries include power generation, waste-water treatment facilities, wind power generation, solar power, government projects, pipelines, railroads and ports, among others. Motion Industries is headquartered in Birmingham, Alabama and operates 15 distribution centers, 523 branches, and 39 service centers in the United States, Canada, Mexico, and Puerto Rico.

The Business Products Group, operating under the name S.P. Richards, distributes more than 61,000 items to over 5,200 resellers and distributors throughout the United States and Canada from a network of 60 distribution centers. Customers include independently owned office product dealers, large contract stationers, national office supply superstores, mail order distributors, internet resellers, college bookstores, office furniture dealers, janitorial and sanitation supply distributors, safety product resellers and food service distributors. S.P. Richards is headquartered in Atlanta, Georgia and operates 34 full-stocking distribution centers, 2 furniture only distribution centers, 5 S.P. Richards Canada distribution centers, 1 GCN Distribution Center, and 2 impact products distribution centers.

The Electrical/Electronic Materials Group, operating under the name EIS, Inc. is one of North America's leading distributors of process materials, production supplies, industrial MRO and value added fabricated parts. EIS, Inc. is headquartered in Atlanta, Georgia, and operates 49 branches and 7 fabrication facilities in the United States, Canada, Mexico, Puerto Rico and the Dominican Republic. Effective in 2018, EIS was combined into Motion Industries and will be identified as its Electrical Specialties Group.

References

External links

Companies listed on the New York Stock Exchange
Companies based in Atlanta
American companies established in 1925
Retail companies established in 1925
1925 establishments in Georgia (U.S. state)
Business services companies established in 1925
1940s initial public offerings